A doubting Thomas is a skeptic who refuses to believe without direct personal experience — a reference to the Gospel of John's depiction of the Apostle Thomas, who, in John's account, refused to believe the resurrected Jesus had appeared to the ten other apostles until he could see and feel Jesus' crucifixion wounds.

In art, the episode (formally called the Incredulity of Thomas) has been frequently depicted since at least the 15th century, with its depiction reflecting a range of theological interpretations.

Gospel account

The episode is related in chapter 20 of the Gospel of John, but not in the three synoptic Gospels. The text of the King James Version is as follows:

Commentators have noted that John avoids saying whether Thomas actually did "thrust" his hand in. Before the Protestant Reformation the usual belief, reflected in artistic depictions, was that he had done so, which most Catholic writers continued to believe, while Protestant writers often thought that he had not.

Regardless of the question of whether Thomas had felt as well as "seen" the physical evidence of the Resurrection of Jesus, the Catholic interpretation was that, although Jesus asserts the superiority of those who have faith without physical evidence, he was nonetheless willing to show Thomas his wound, and let him feel it. This was used by theologians as biblical encouragement for the use of physical experiences such as pilgrimages, veneration of relics and ritual in reinforcing Christian beliefs.

Protestant theologians emphasized Jesus' statement of the superiority of "faith alone" (see sola fide), although the evangelical-leaning Anglican Thomas Hartwell Horne, in his widely read Introduction to the Critical Study and Knowledge of the Holy Scriptures (first published in 1818) treated Thomas's incredulity, which he extended somewhat to the other apostles, approvingly, as evidence both of the veracity of the gospels, as a "forger" would be unlikely to have invented it, and of their proper suspicion of the seemingly impossible, demonstrating their reliability as witnesses. In the early church, Gnostic authors were very insistent that Thomas did not actually examine Jesus, and elaborated on this in apocryphal accounts, perhaps tending to push their non-Gnostic opponents in the other direction.

The theological interpretation of the episode has concentrated on it as a demonstration of the reality of the resurrection, but as early as the writings of the 4th- and 5th-century saints John Chrysostom and Cyril of Alexandria it had been given a eucharistic interpretation, seen as an allegory of the sacrament of the Eucharist, what remained a recurring theme in commentary.

Art

In art this subject, formally termed The Incredulity of Saint Thomas, has been common since at least the early 6th century, when it appears in the mosaics at Basilica of Sant'Apollinare Nuovo in Ravenna, and on the Monza ampullae.  In those depictions, as later in the Baroque, the subject, normally depicted at the moment Thomas puts his fingers into Jesus' side, was used to emphasize the importance of physical experiences and evidences for the believer, as described above.  The Ravenna mosaic introduces the motif of Jesus raising his hand high to reveal the wound in his side; his pose often, but not always, is such that the wounds on his hands can also be seen, and often those on his feet as well. 
  
The scene was used in a number of contexts in medieval art, including Byzantine icons. Where there was room all the apostles were often shown, and sometimes Thomas' acceptance of the Resurrection is shown, with Thomas kneeling and Jesus blessing him.  This iconography leaves it unclear whether the moment shown follows an examination or not, but probably suggests that it does not, especially in Protestant art.  From the late Middle Ages onwards a number of variations of the poses of the two figures occur (see gallery). The typical "touching" representation formed one of a number of scenes sometimes placed around a central Crucifixion of Jesus, and is one of the scenes shown on the Irish Muiredach's High Cross, and the subject of a large relief in the famous Romanesque sculpted cloister at the Abbey of Santo Domingo de Silos.  In works showing pairs of typologically related scenes from the Old and New Testaments it could be paired with Jacob Wrestling with the Angel, but in a 10th-century Ottonian ivory diptych it is paired with Moses receiving the Law, comparing both the two Biblical Testaments and the support for the faith from both textual "sacred writ" and physical evidences.

In the later Middle Ages Jesus with one side of his robe pulled back, displaying the wound in his side and his other four wounds (called the ostentatio vulnerum), was taken from images with Thomas and turned into a pose adopted by Jesus alone, who often places his own fingers into the wound in his side.  This form became a common feature of single iconic figures of Jesus and subjects such as the Last Judgement (where Bamberg Cathedral has an early example of about 1235), Christ in Majesty, the Man of Sorrows and Christ with the Arma Christi, and was used to emphasize Christ's suffering as well as the fact of his Resurrection.

In the Renaissance the famous sculpted pair of Christ and St. Thomas by Andrea del Verrocchio (1467–1483) for the Orsanmichele in Florence is the best known representation; the subject is rare in free-standing sculpture. This guild church also housed commercial tribunals, and the presentation of physical evidence gave the subject a particular relevance to courts and justice, and it appeared on many other buildings in Tuscany with judicial functions.  The Medici family, heavily involved in the commission, also had a particular association with St Thomas, though the painting by Salviati seems to reflect anti-Medici feeling in the 1540s.

The subject enjoyed a revival in popularity in Counter-Reformation art as an assertion of Catholic doctrine against Protestant rejection of the Catholic practices which the episode was held to support, and Protestant belief in "faith alone".  In the Catholic interpretation, although Jesus asserts the superiority of those who have faith without physical evidence, he was nonetheless willing to show Thomas his wound, and let him feel it.  The Incredulity of Saint Thomas by Caravaggio (c. 1601–1602) is now the most famous depiction (unusually showing Thomas to the viewer's right of Jesus), but there are many others, especially by the Utrecht Caravaggisti, painting in a Protestant environment, such as the Flemish Caravaggist Matthias Stom, whose two versions of the subject are now in Madrid and Bergamo.  Both Rembrandt (Pushkin Museum) and Rubens (centrepiece of the Rockox Triptych, Royal Museum of Fine Arts, Antwerp) also painted it.

Gallery

Medieval drama
The dramatic nature of the episode meant that it often featured in medieval drama telling the story of the life of Jesus.  It takes the whole of "Play 41" of the York Mystery Cycle, probably dating from some time between 1463 and 1477, which takes 195 six-line stanzas to tell it. Other shorter cycles omit it, and the Chester Mystery Plays take 70 lines to cover it.

Related legends
The biblical episode generated two late medieval legends or stories, which also appear in art.

Girdle of Thomas

In this story, at the Assumption of Mary, where the other apostles were present, Thomas once again missed the occasion (being on his way back from his mission to India), so the Virgin Mary, aware of Thomas' sceptical nature, appeared to him individually and dropped the girdle (cloth belt) she was wearing down onto him, to give him a physical proof of what he had seen.  In other versions he is present at the actual Assumption, and the Virgin dropped her girdle down to him as she was taken up to heaven.  The supposed girdle itself (Sacra Cintola) is a relic of Prato Cathedral, and its veneration was regarded as especially helpful for pregnant women.  After Florence took control of Prato in 1350–51, the girdle begins to feature in Florentine art and to be shown worn by figures of Madonna del Parto, iconic figures showing the Virgin Mary when pregnant.

The first version of the story is called the Madonna of the Girdle in art.  An altarpiece by Palma Vecchio, now in the Brera Gallery in Milan, shows an intermediate version, with Thomas hurrying towards the other apostles, and the Virgin taking off her girdle. In other works Thomas is catching the falling girdle, or has received the girdle and holds it.

Incredulity of Jerome
Saint Francis of Assisi (1181/1182 – 1226) had a vision in 1224, after which he acquired stigmata on his own body, repeating the wounds of Jesus, which he kept until his death.  According to the many who saw them, the wounds on his hands and feet were as if the nails still remained in place, and the nail-like projections could be moved. An early biographer of Francis, Saint Bonaventure (1221 – 1274), reported that a soldier called Jerome was sceptical and moved the "nails" about.  Jerome is thought to be shown examining Francis' feet in the frescos of the Bardi Chapel of Santa Croce, Florence by Giotto and his workshop, and appears in some other Franciscan works.

See also

 Life of Jesus in the New Testament

References

Citations

Sources

Cassidy, Brendan, "A Relic, Some Pictures and the Mothers of Florence in the Late Fourteenth Century", Gesta, Vol. 30, No. 2 (1991), pp. 91–99, The University of Chicago Press on behalf of the International Center of Medieval Art, JSTOR

Christian iconography
Christian terminology
Gospel of John
Iconography of Jesus
Resurrection of Jesus in the New Testament
Thomas the Apostle
Doubt